Erich Campe (1 February 1912 – 5 May 1977) was a German boxer who competed in the 1932 Summer Olympics.

He was born in Berlin.

Amateur career
In 1932 he won the silver medal in the welterweight class after losing the final against Edward Flynn.  Campe was the German Welterweight Champion 1932 and 1934.

Olympic results
Defeated Aikoku Hirabayashi (Japan) PTS
Defeated Carl Jensen (Denmark) PTS
Defeated Bruno Ahlberg (Finland) PTS
Lost to Edward Flynn (USA) PTS

References
 sports-reference.com

External links

1912 births
1977 deaths
Boxers from Berlin
Welterweight boxers
Olympic boxers of Germany
Boxers at the 1932 Summer Olympics
Olympic silver medalists for Germany
Olympic medalists in boxing
Medalists at the 1932 Summer Olympics
German male boxers